Santhekasalagere  is a village in the southern state of Karnataka, India. It is located in the Mandya taluk of Mandya district in Karnataka.

Demographics
 Census of India, Santhekasalagere had a population of 6,773 consisting of 3,450 males and 3,323 females.

See also
 Mandya
 Districts of Karnataka

References

External links
 http://Mandya.nic.in/

Villages in Mandya district